Chiang Chien-ming, (born May 27, 1985 in Taiwan), is a starting pitcher for the Yomiuri Giants of Nippon Professional Baseball.  He was initially signed at 2005, became the fifth Taiwanese Yomiuri Giants' players. His NPB debut was on June 14, 2006, first start was on August 22, and got first win.

He played for 2006 World Baseball Classic Taiwan national team, and represented Taiwan to play Baseball games of 2006 Asian Games, where he won the gold medal.

External links
Chiang's stats in Japan Yahoo!
Japanese Baseball

1985 births
Living people
2006 World Baseball Classic players
Taiwanese expatriate baseball players in Japan
Yomiuri Giants players
Baseball players from New Taipei
Asian Games medalists in baseball
Baseball players at the 2006 Asian Games
Baseball players at the 2018 Asian Games
Asian Games gold medalists for Chinese Taipei
Asian Games bronze medalists for Chinese Taipei
Medalists at the 2006 Asian Games
Medalists at the 2018 Asian Games